Phillinoisip "Phillip" Gyau (born February 7, 1966) is a former U.S. soccer forward who is the current head coach of the Howard Bison men's soccer program.  He spent his outdoor career in the American Soccer League and the American Professional Soccer League, his indoor career with the Washington Warthogs and Baltimore Blast, and spent nine years with the U.S. National Beach Soccer team.  He earned six caps with the U.S. national team.  In 2014, he became the head coach for Howard University's soccer team. Gyau is also the father of U.S. international Joe Gyau.

Youth and college
The son of Joseph "Nana" Gyau, a member of the Ghana national football team, Gyau was born in Silver Spring, Maryland and  grew up in Maryland after his father signed with the Washington Darts of the North American Soccer League (NASL).  Gyau attended Gwynn Park High School in Brandywine, Maryland from 1978 to 1982.  After graduating from high school, he attended Howard University where he played on the men's soccer team from 1982 to 1985.  In 1985, he played for Club España of Washington, D.C. when it won the National Amateur Cup.

ASL
In 1988, Gyau signed with the Washington Diplomats of the American Soccer League (ASL).  He moved to the Maryland Bays in 1989 and played three seasons with them.

APSL
In the spring of 1990, the ASL merged with the Western Soccer League to create the American Professional Soccer League (APSL).  In 1990, Gyau was a first team All Star and the APSL MVP while scoring twelve goals with the Bays.  The Bays folded at the end of the 1991 season and Gyau moved to the Tampa Bay Rowdies.  While he scored seven goals in sixteen games with the Rowdies in 1992, he moved to the Colorado Foxes for the 1993 season.  However, he moved from Colorado to the Los Angeles Salsa after eight games.  That year, the Foxes and the Salsa met in the APSL title game.  Gyau scored the first goal of the game, but the Foxes tied it late and won in overtime.  In 1994, Gyau was with the Montreal Impact.

CISL
In 1995, Gyau moved back to Washington, D.C., to sign with the Baltimore Blast of the MISL.  He played only one game, then moved to the Washington Warthogs of the Continental Indoor Soccer League (CISL).  He spent at least two seasons with the Warthogs.

National team
Gyau earned his first cap with the U.S. national team in a June 4, 1989 win over Peru.  He played a handful of games through the rest of 1989, then two games in 1990.  His last game with the national team came in an October 19, 1991 loss to North Korea.

Beach soccer
Gyau began playing beach soccer beginning in 1997 including nine years as the captain of the U.S. National Beach Soccer Team.

Coaching
In 1998, Gyau became the head coach of the National Beach Soccer Team, a position he held until 2002.  In 2003, he became the head coach of The Bullis School's girls' soccer team.  In his three years as coach, he took the team to a 26–28–2 record.  He has also coached various youth teams, including the Bethesda Fury, with which he won three state and one regional championship; the Bethesda Eclipse, winner of four state and one regional championship.  He is on staff with the D.C. United as its U-13 Boys' head coach.  He is also the founder and director of Next Level Development, a soccer development program. He is the St. Johns College High School varsity coach in Washington, D.C. He also coached other teams, one of them being the Olney Pumas U-16 team in the NCSL league. Since that time he has been coaching MSC Revolution, a rising U-17 boys' soccer team which he was one both NCSL Division 1 with, as well as the Bethesda Tournament, helping to rank the team 3rd in the state of Maryland.

References

1966 births
Living people
African-American soccer players
American expatriate sportspeople in Canada
American Professional Soccer League players
American soccer coaches
American Soccer League (1988–89) players
American soccer players
American expatriate soccer players
Baltimore Blast (NPSL) players
Colorado Foxes players
Continental Indoor Soccer League players
Expatriate soccer players in Canada
Association football forwards
American sportspeople of Ghanaian descent
Howard Bison men's soccer players
Howard Bison men's soccer coaches
Los Angeles Salsa players
Maryland Bays players
Montreal Impact (1992–2011) players
People from Silver Spring, Maryland
Soccer players from Maryland
Tampa Bay Rowdies (1975–1993) players
United States men's international soccer players
Washington Diplomats (1988–1990) players
Washington Warthogs players
People from Brandywine, Maryland
American beach soccer players
Sportspeople from Montgomery County, Maryland
High school soccer coaches in the United States
21st-century African-American people
20th-century African-American sportspeople